Surrey College or Surry College can refer to:

Surrey Community College, in Surrey, British Columbia
Surry Community College, Dobson, North Carolina, USA
East Surrey College, Redhill, London, England
North East Surrey College of Technology, Epsom and Ewell, Surrey, England
University of Surrey, Guildford, Surrey, England

See also
List of schools in Surrey